Maurice Paul Jean Asselin (24 June 1882 – 27 September 1947) was a French painter, watercolourist, printmaker, lithographer, engraver and illustrator, associated with the School of Paris. He is best known for still lifes and nudes. Other recurring themes in his work are motherhood, and the landscapes and seascapes of Brittany. He also worked as a book illustrator, particularly in the 1920s. His personal style was characterised by subdued colours, sensitive brushwork and a strong sense of composition and design.

He was awarded the rank of Officier de la Légion d'honneur in 1939.

Biography

Early life 

Maurice Asselin was born on 24 June 1882 in Orléans. His father was a coachman, and his mother ran the tobacco shop La Pipe d'or at the corner of rue Sainte-Catherine and rue Jeanne-d'Arc, before they took over a restaurant called L'Auberge de la rue Sainte-Catherine. After studying design and painting at the Collège Sainte-Croix in Orléans, which ended in his graduating second class, in 1899 he began as an apprentice working with calico in the fabric house Aux Travailleurs at place de la République in Orléans, and then in 1900 in a textile house in the Sentier district of Paris. Described as a half-hearted and "distracted employee", he returned to spend the years 1901–1903 in Orléans, his father having died in 1902. In his sketchbook, from which he was never separated from childhood, he captured views of Orléans, Tigy, Saint-Hilaire-Saint-Mesmin, before returning to Paris where he was a student of Fernand Cormon at the École nationale supérieure des Beaux-Arts (National School of Fine Arts). The academic teaching, which he disliked, was compensated by in-depth observation of Paul Cézanne and the Impressionists at the Musée du Luxembourg and the Louvre. This was interrupted by the onset of tuberculosis, which he probably acquired in the badly heated rooms he occupied in the attics of the 15th arrondissement, leading to his hospitalisation in an Auvergne sanatorium.

Brittany, Italy, first exhibitions 

Maurice Asselin first visited Brittany in 1905, where he met the painter Jacques Vaillant at Moëlan-sur-Mer. He returned there in 1906 and 1907. After his first showings at Parisian exhibitions (the Salon des indépendants in 1906, and the Salon d'automne in 1907, of which he became a member and member of the jury in 1910), he left for Italy where, from May to October 1908, he bicycled from Rome to Florence, spending time in Anticoli Corrado, Assisi, and Siena. Asselin returned to Italy in 1910 where from Genoa he went to Naples, spent time in Rome, and finally rented a small studio in Anticoli Corrado throughout the summer, where his first works were completed on the theme of the nude.

Asselin first met the writer Pierre Mac Orlan in 1910 in Moëlan-sur-Mer, and this was followed by a long friendship. Mac Orlan wrote in his memoirs of the summer activities of Maurice Asselin and his painter friends Ricardo Florès, Émile Jourdan and Jacques Vaillant in Brigneau-en-Moëlan at La mère Bacon, "a small fishing inn perched on a rock, located at the entrance to the jetty, which it overlooked". "Maurice Asselin brings delicate watercolours back from Concarneau every summer," confirmed another friend of the artist, the novelist Roland Dorgelès.

Returning to Paris, Asselin lived from 1911 at 39, rue Lamarck. Asselin, Mac Orlan, Roland Dorgelès and many other residents of Montmartre including Francis Carco and Maurice Sauvayre enjoyed colourful Sunday outings to the Auberge de l'Œuf dur et du Commerce in Saint-Cyr-sur-Morin.

On 31 July 1914, back in the south of France in Finistère, Asselin, Vaillant and Mac Orlan heard of France's entry into the First World War, heralded by the tocsin bell.

England 

In 1912 the art critic André Salmon described Maurice Asselin as "one of the young painters most likely to succeed." That year also saw the first of the artist's many trips to London, with his first solo exhibition being held there in February 1913. Between 1914 and 1916 he was Walter Sickert’s closest friend, for a time sharing the latter's apartment in Red Lion Square. In the monthly column that Sickert wrote in The Burlington Magazine at the time, in December 1915 he made a comparative study of the paintings of Asselin and Roger Fry, which concluded Asselin's superiority. Each of the two artists painted the portrait of the other; the portrait of Asselin painted in 1915 by Sickert is now in the collections of the Potteries Museum & Art Gallery in Stoke-on-Trent, while Asselin kept his "Portrait of Walter Sickert" at his home in Montmartre and later in Neuilly-sur-Seine. Asselin also spent time in 1915 in Ashford with another painter friend, Ludovic-Rodo Pissarro. On his return to Paris, he lived from 1916 at 121,  in the 18th arrondissement.

Artists’ Missions to the Armies 
At the instigation of General Niox, director of the Musée de l’Armée in Paris, a decree of 8 November 1916 declared that "the Under-Secretary of State for Fine Arts, with the authorisation of the Minister of War, may entrust to artists assignments with the armies". A committee which included art historian and curator Léonce Bénédite, and art critics François Thiébault-Sisson and Arsène Alexandre was put in charge of selecting artists not mobilised, stipulating that their purpose was "the painting of real history", rather than idealistic, symbolic or patriotic imagery. The "modern" painters thus selected, exhibitors at the Salon d'automne and the Salon des indépendants, ranged from the former nabis (Pierre Bonnard, Édouard Vuillard, Félix Vallotton, Maurice Denis) to the "new post-Cézanne landscape painters" who at the time included Maurice Asselin, Louis Charlot, Henri Lebasque, Henri Ottmann, Gaston Prunier, and Jules-Émile Zingg, and were commissioned in this way to document history which was not yet written. The presence of Asselin's work in the collections of the Musée de l’Armée shows his commitment to the "Artists’ Missions to the Armies in 1917".

After the First World War 

Maurice Asselin married Paton on 17 September 1919, a marriage which produced three sons, Bernard in 1922, Jean in 1923 and Georges in 1925, and introduced the theme of motherhood into his work. He returned to Brittany in the 1920s and found Pierre Mac Orlan, Jacques Vaillant and Pierre-Eugène Clairin there, with the group taking up residence at the Hôtel de la Poste run by the wife of the painter Ernest Correlleau in Pont-Aven. In 1925, in the company of the painter André Fraye, he travelled along the Mediterranean coast (Marseille, Sainte-Maxime, Saint-Tropez), in the Var (Le Luc) and in the Vaucluse (Avignon, Orange). That same year, Asselin left Montmartre to settle at 45–47, rue du Bois-de-Boulogne in Neuilly-sur-Seine, in the residence-workshop whose design and construction he entrusted to the architect and designer Pierre Patout.

Asselin returned to southern France in 1927 with Paton and their three sons. In the 1930s (his mother died in Orléans in 1932) saw him again in Brittany: Concarneau in 1930, Douarnenez in 1931, Beuzec-Conq in 1932, Pont-Aven until 1938, Kerdruc in 1939, all in an entourage made up of painters Pierre-Eugène Clairin, Émile Compard, Ernest Correleau, Fernand Dauchot, Émile Jourdan, Jean Puy, René Thomsen, and with literary friends too: Pierre Mac Orlan, always, but also Max Jacob or Liam O'Flaherty whose portrait Asselin painted. The exoduses of the Second World War led Asselin and his family to Chalonnes-sur-Loire until the armistice of 22 June 1940 between France and Nazi Germany. Both psychological suffering (Asselin resented defeat and the Occupation) and physical pain (osteoarthritis in his hip made walking difficult) are felt in his painting, a period of "red nudes" and small bunches of flowers. "His palette is hardening" noted his son Georges Asselin.

Death 

In 1945, he went to Brittany to stay with the Correleaus at the Hôtel de la Poste in Pont-Aven, for the last time. He was admitted to Saint-Antoine Hospital in Paris in 1947, was operated on by Professor Bergeret on Monday 22 September and died on Saturday 27 September.

Distinctions 
 Officer of the Legion of Honour

Posterity: “the realist reaction” 

Art historian and critic Bernard Dorival described Maurice Asselin, along with Edmond Ceria, André Dunoyer de Segonzac, Charles Dufresne, Paul-Élie Gernez, Louise Hervieu, Maurice Loutreuil and Henry de Waroquier as painters of the "realist reaction" who "prefer the frank realism of the Impressionists and the sincerity with which they questioned nature" to "the idealism and to the photographic realism" of the academic tradition of the 19th century." “Against the unrealism of the Cubists, they pose as heirs to the independent masters of the third quarter of the 19th century, primarily Gustave Courbet, the spiritual father of their movement". Dorival supported his argument by quoting Asselin: "if you really love painting, you will not only ask it to be a decoration for the walls of your home, but first of all to be food for your interior life.” Asselin continued: “no cerebral combination, no theory can give birth to a work of art… Art springs from the amazed love of life.”

Quotes

Sayings of Maurice Asselin 

“A beautiful work must, by its arrangement, its rhythm, the choice of the elements which compose it, satisfy the refined man, and, by the impression of life which it releases, move the simplest man."  – Maurice Asselin

Critical reception 

 "It is marvellous to see all that Asselin can enclose in a few charcoal lines enhanced with watercolour. Rather than the tones of nature, it expresses the nuances of light; and it is extremely delicate, without ever falling into blandness." – François Fosca
 "Sober painting, a little cold, solid, with geometrically constructed undersides... In truth, it is deliberately proletarian, but the sincerity of the artist bursts, curls, shines through with each touch. With Maurice Asselin, no rich, opulent, bourgeois interiors, filled with tinsel, but studios for poets, actors, artists, rooms for workers, modest, simple, with a somewhat crude decor, flowers beautiful and fresh, shown on rough tables. The painter presents us with portraits of a perfect likeness, and his preference is for writers, poets, artists whom he surprises in their private moments... Jules Romains meditates on his balcony, perhaps forging some enthusiastic unanimist poem. Behind him the city, with its tumble of red and blue roofs, its red chimneys, blazes under the sun. Asselin has achieved one of his happiest contrasts. Paul Bour, lying in a rocking chair, reads a book. Émile Jourdan, a grey felt hat over his ear, seems a modern musketeer. His aquiline profile stands out, clean, clear, cursive, well worth it... Maurice Asselin loves the beauty of women's profiles. His well-drawn nudes offer themselves to our eyes without any frivolity. Their plasticity and tonality sometimes make one think of Félix Valloton; it is no mean homage that I pay to the artist in this way." – Georges Turpin
 "Maurice Asselin, who shows us peasant figures in their familiar setting, rises by a sustained effort to the purest tradition. In front of his serious, solid canvases, without false effect, one involuntarily thinks of the Le Nain brothers, even though the colour of the modern painter is more lively and more flowery." – Jean Mériem
 "With Asselin, intimacy has a narrower meaning than with Georges d'Espagnat. It is the poetry of the family environment in which he lives. Raised in a calm provincial atmosphere, Asselin was perhaps inclined by atavism and education to this expression of domestic charm. Admittedly, he painted landscapes and still lifes, but most frequently what comes back in his work is the child, the woman engaged in domestic work, motherhood. Woman has for him this somewhat sad gravity which is very much in the French tradition and which makes one think of the Le Nain whose women have Asselin’s robustness. His nudes also have this hint of intimacy, of reserve, which is specific to the nude in French painting. With regard to his technique, very restrained in its effects, Asselin owes nothing to Fauvism, but a lot to Cézanne. Without finding in his painting all the processes of the master of Aix-en-Provence, as in the painting of Simon-Lévy one cannot help thinking that it is the spirit of Cézanne which animates his paintings. whose passages of planes are so clearly delimited so as to perfectly highlight the luminous volumes." – Germain Bazin   
 "Asselin always maintains the same sober note that gives his interior scenes their beautiful simplicity." – Raymond Cogniat
 "Nudes, flowers, landscapes, figures are painted in light with the sobriety, the solidity which gives strength to everything Asselin paints. But the bare side of his painting does not exclude its richness, in the light where, against a grey background, the plumage of a pheasant or the sumptuousness of a flower appear in all their magnificence, and it is an enchantment." – Le Figaro, "Courrier des arts" section, May 1937
 "For Asselin, sensitivity must be the very reason for art." – Gaston Diehl
 "I thank Maurice Asselin, painter of the spiritual light of men and things, because these already abolished landscapes, these characters who have become literary ghosts remain in the reality of these testimonies which together made our personality and our reason to exist honourably." – Pierre MacOrlan
 "A refined intimist, Maurice Asselin knew how to irradiate his characters with a subtle light, represented in the attitudes of everyday life, painted with a clear and delicate palette, supported by a light and precise line; they live a life that is both secret and natural. As for his watercolours, bathed in limpid light, with just the right amount of colour and white, they place Maurice Asselin among the best watercolourists of our time. – Pierre Imbourg
 "The subtlety of his half-tones suggest a dreamy universe." – René Huyghe et Jean Rudel
 "He remains one of the most gifted representatives of the realism that is proper to the School of Paris, which brought together all the previous disciplines. – Gérald Schurr
 "By remaining close to life he paints intimate, warm scenes, portraying members of his family, more particularly his wife, and his friends. He renders landscapes with emotion, especially when it comes to watercolours with rapid and luminous lines." – Alain Pizerra.

Works

Works in books

Works in public collections 
List is not exhaustive; in alphabetic order of location.

 
 Algiers, National Museum of Fine Arts of Algiers: cabinet of prints and engravings

 
 Ghent, Museum of Fine Arts

 
 Copenhagen, National Gallery of Denmark, four paintings from the Rump collection

  
 Aix-les-Bains, Faure Museum Modèle nu au fauteuil (Nude model in chair)
 Albi, Musée Toulouse-Lautrec 
 Portrait of Édouard Branly, 1936 
 Femme nue debout (Nude woman standing)
 Bagnols-sur-Cèze, Musée Albert-André Rue de Tournon in Paris
 Brest, Musée des Beaux-Arts de Brest Le repos du modèle (Model at rest), oil on canvas, 72.8 x 59.8 cm
 Cambrai, : Le Café dans le jardin (Coffee in the Garden)
 Grenoble, Museum of Grenoble Portrait of Jean Pellerin in Keriolet, 1920
 Guéret, Museum of the Sénatorerie: Jeune femme au piano (Young Woman at the Piano), 1927
 Lyon, Museum of Fine Arts of Lyon
 Nanterre, The Contemporary: Mobilisation
 Nantes, Musée d'Arts de Nantes Maternité (Motherhood), 1923, oil on canvas
 Orléans, Musée des beaux-arts d'Orléans Nu allongé (Reclining nude), 1912
 Paris
 Bibliothèque nationale de France Portraits of Maurice Farina
 Ministry for Europe and Foreign Affairs (France) Concarneau Basin
 Musée d'Art Moderne de Paris At the Glénans, about 1932–1935, watercolour
 Musée National d'Art Moderne
 Le Café dans le jardin (Coffee in the Garden), 1922
 Checy, 1927
 L'Arven de Rosbraz, 1938, watercolour
 L'Arc de triomphe du Carrousel, 1938
 Péronne, Alfred Danicourt Museum
 Pont-Aven, Musée des Beaux-Arts de Pont-Aven
 Self-portrait 
 La Jetée de Brigneau (The Pier of Brigneau)
 Rennes, Museum of Fine Arts of Rennes Vue de Île Raguenès (View of Île Raguenès), 1906, charcoal and watercolour
 Saint-Brieuc, town hall Curnonsky en Bretagne (Curnonsky in Brittany), loan from the National Foundation for Contemporary Art
 Versailles, Musée Lambinet Barques au port (Boats in port), watercolour
 Location unknown Curnonsky à la table de Mélanie Rouat (Curnonsky at Mélanie Rouat's Table), 1927, oil on canvas, formerly in Paris at the Musée du Luxembourg

 
 National Museum of History and Art, Luxembourg City

 
 Amsterdam, Stedelijk Museum
 The Hague, Kunstmuseum Den Haag

 
 Christchurch, Christchurch Art Gallery Te Puna o Waiwhetu

 
 Moscow, Pushkin Museum

 
 Geneva, Petit Palais Museum
 Les Péniches (The Barges), 1913, oil on canvas
 Jeune femme se dénudant (Young Woman Undressing), about 1927, oil on canvas

 
 Cambridge, University of Cambridge, Fitzwilliam Museum Bateaux (Boats)
 Cheltenham, The Wilson (Cheltenham) Deux jeunes filles lisant (Two Girls Reading), oil on canvas
 Leeds, Leeds City Museum
 London, British Museum
 Manchester Whitworth Art Gallery
 Wakefield, The Hepworth Wakefield Anemones, oil on canvas

 
 Boston, Museum of Fine Arts
 Los Angeles, Los Angeles County Museum of Art
 New York City
 Brooklyn Museum
 Museum of Modern Art Maternité (Motherhood), lithograph

Works in private collections 
 Former collection of Pierre Mac Orlan, location unknown
 Former collection of Marius Borgeaud,  Portrait de Marius Borgeaud, location unknown
 Former collection of Georges Renand – Jeannine et Édouard Chapet, Berge de la Seine, aquarelle.

Gallery

Exhibitions

Solo exhibitions 

 Galerie Eugène Blot, Paris, February 1909, December 1911, November 1916
 Galerie Devambez, 1911
 Museum of Copenhagen, 1911
 Galerie Druet, 20, Rue Royale, Paris, 1911, November 1917, December 1918, March 1923, February 1924, 1930
 Galerie Levesque, Paris, 1911
 Carfax & Co, London, February 1913, November 1915
 Galerie Vildrac, Paris, April 1914
 Galerie Georges Pesson, Paris, November 1919
 Galerie Marcel Bernheim, May 1921, November–December 1925, May 1933, May 1937, 1939
 Maurice Asselin – Rétrospective, Galerie Georges Bernheim, Paris, May 1928, May 1930
 American Women's Club, Paris, 1935
 Cent toiles et aquarelles de Maurice Asselin, Tokyo, 1935
 Galerie Charpentier, Paris, May 1935, 1943 (Cent aquarelles d'Asselin), 1945.
 Galerie Saluden, Brest, 1936
 Galerie Roger Dequoy, Paris, 1941
 Galerie Jacques Dubourg, Paris, 1943
 Galerie André Maurice, Paris, June–July 1950, 1953, December 1954 – January 1955, October 1957 (rétrospective, dixième anniversaire du décès de l'artiste)
 Galerie René Drouet, Paris, March–April 1961
 Galerie Nichido, Tokyo, 1969
 Galerie Schmidt, Paris, February–March 1970
 Hommage à Maurice Asselin – Soixante-dix toiles, aquarelles et dessins (Tribute to Maurice Asselin – Seventy paintings, watercolours and drawings), Galerie Daniel Péron, Pont-Aven, July–September 1983
 Maurice Asselin et la Bretagne, Musée des Beaux-Arts de Pont-Aven, April–June 2002

Exhibitions with others 

 Salon des indépendants, Paris, from 1906
 Salon d'automne, Paris, from 1907 to 1942 (illustration de la couverture du catalogue en 1936).
 Salon des Tuileries, Paris, 1909, 1944
 Maurice Asselin, Charles Camoin, Henri Manguin, Albert Marquet, Jean Puy, Maurice de Vlaminck, Moderne Galerie, Munich, 1909
 Maurice Asselin, Lucien Mainssieux, Claude Rameau, Galerie Druet, Paris, 1913
 Exposition de l'Association des artistes de Hambourg, Hamburg, November–December 1919
 La jeune peinture française – Maurice Asselin, Roger Bissière, André Derain, Charles Dufresne, André Dunoyer de Segonzac, Jean Fernand-Trochain, Othon Friesz, André Lhote, Robert Lotiron, Maurice Utrillo, Henry de Waroquier… (Young French Painting…), Galerie Manzi-Joyant, Paris, June–July 1920
 Le premier groupe – Maurice Asselin, Albert Marquet… (The First Group…), Galerie Marcel Bernheim, 1920
 Exposition "Petites Tuileries" – Quarante peintres de l'École de Paris : Maurice Asselin, André Bauchant, Charles Kvapil, Henri Lebasque, Mela Muter, Anders Osterlind, Valentine Prax, Jean Puy, Jean Souverbie, Pierre Tal-Coat, Dallas Public Art Gallery, Dallas, Texas, March–April 1932
 Exposition du Onzième groupe des artistes de ce temps : Maurice Asselin, Charles Camoin, Henri Manguin, Albert Marquet, Jean Puy, Petit Palais, Paris, December 1935 – January 1936
 Ausstellung Französischer Kunst den Gegenwart (Exhibition of Contemporary French Art), Preussische Akademie der Künste, Berlin, June 1937
 Le quatrième Salon de Mai à Orléans, Musée des beaux-arts d'Orléans, 1948
 Undated exhibition: Maurice Asselin (peintures) et Louis Dejean (sculptures), Galerie Pigalle, Paris
 Marius Borgeaud ou la magie de l'instant ('Marius Borgeaud or the magic of the moment), Fondation Gianadda, Martigny (Switzerland), November 2001 – January 2002
 Les peintres graveurs et la mer (Painters, Engravers and the Sea), Espace Mélanie, Riec-sur-Bélon, August 2007
 De Gauguin à Marcel Gromaire, la naissance d'un musée (From Gauguin to Marcel Gromaire, the birth of a museum), Musée de Pont-Aven, August–September 2012.
 Boire aux Champs libres (Drinking in the Open Fields), Rennes, November 2015 – April 2016

Sales 
 Delorme et Collin du Bocage, auctioneers, Vente de l'atelier Maurice Asselin (Sale of the Maurice Asselin Workshop), salle des ventes du 9, rue de Provence, Paris, 9 March 2017

Bibliography

Notes

References

External links 
Maurice Asselin in his studio, photographed by Laure Albin Guillot
 Signature of Maurice Asselin on ArtCult

1882 births
1947 deaths
Artists from Paris
French male painters
20th-century French painters
École des Beaux-Arts alumni
20th-century French male artists
Post-impressionist painters
Landscape artists
French still life painters
Modern painters
Officiers of the Légion d'honneur
French engravers
War artists
Still life painters
French portrait painters
School of Paris